John Dayton Cerna, often credited as J. D. Cerna, is an American actor and a writer. He appeared in the 1988-89 horror film The Dead Come Home. In the 1995 coming-of-age short film Alkali, Iowa, which is part of Boys Life 2, the 1997 compilation of short films about gay males, Cerna portrayed Jack Gudmanson, a leading character who is coming to terms of his sexuality and learns about his father's secret past. He was a columnist for the LGBT-related newspaper Washington Blade in 2002–05. He wrote and performed a leading role of his semi-autobiographical play Not as Cute as Picture, whose story focuses on a "young gay man's pursuit of purpose[,] often obstructed by [crisis] of AIDS," set in 1994. The play was nominated in the 14th Annual GLAAD Media Awards (2003) for Outstanding Theatre: Washington D. C. He wrote another play Problem Cat: A Love Story.
Cerna is openly gay.

References

External links 

 
 Biography at JD Cerna's Wordpress blog, Gaymanranting
 Spotlight on...JD Cerna at Theater in the Now (BlogSpot)

Year of birth missing (living people)
Living people
American gay actors
American male film actors
American male writers